Speed limits in the Philippines are specified in Republic Act No. 4136, or the Land Transportation and Traffic Code of the Philippines, which took effect on its approval on June 20, 1964. The act covers a number of areas other areas than speed limits, and was amended regarding some of those areas by Republic Act No. 10930, which was approved on August 2, 2017. , RA 4136 is listed as current by the Land Transportation Office of the Philippines.

The speed limit sign is a red circle with numbers inside as in most countries including Japan, Thailand and Malaysia.

Speed limits specified by RA 4136
Speed limits defined by RA 4136 only apply to all kinds of motor vehicles on public highways, including cars, motorcycles, jeepneys, and trucks. 

All public thoroughfares, boulevards, driveways, avenues, parks, and alleys are defined as "public highways" under this act. As such, speed limits do not apply to corridors within private property.

Speed limits on expressways
, maximum speed limits on expressways are as follows: 
 Maximum speed for cars and 400cc motorcycles (except Skyway Stage 3) – 
 Maximum speed for trucks and buses (except SCTEX and TPLEX) – 
 Minimum speed for all vehicles – 
 Maximum speed on NAIAX and Skyway Stage 3 –

Speed limits on highways in Metro Manila
In Metro Manila, the Metropolitan Manila Development Authority (MMDA) defines a  maximum speed limit on radial and circumferential roads that it has jurisdiction over, including Commonwealth Avenue and Macapagal Boulevard.
 Cars and motorcycles  – 
 Trucks and buses –

Enforcement
Enforcement of speed limits are low in the Philippines due to lack of awareness of the mandate set by RA 4136. To address this concern, DOTr, DPWH and DILG issued a joint memorandum in 2018 addressed to Local Government Units regarding the implementation of RA 4136. The LGUs are enjoined to adopt guidelines on road classification, speed limit setting and enforcement and collection and analysis of road crash data. The United Nations Road Safety Fund has conducted training-of-trainers for law enforcement personnel who can then in turn train others in practical speed enforcement training.

References

Phili
Road transportation in the Philippines